Agonidium is a genus of beetles in the family Carabidae, containing the following species:

Agonidium alacre (Boheman, 1848)
Agonidium amplipenne (Gestro, 1895)
Agonidium babaulti (Burgeon, 1935)
Agonidium bamboutense (Burgeon, 1942)
Agonidium betsileo (Alluaud, 1932)
Agonidium birmanicum (Bates, 1892)
Agonidium camerunicum (Basilewsky, 1985)
Agonidium chowo (Basilewsky, 1988)
Agonidium comoricum (Basilewsky, 1985)
Agonidium cyanipenne (Bates, 1892)
Agonidium descarpentriesi (Basilewsky, 1985)
Agonidium dilaticolle (Bates, 1892)
Agonidium excisum (Bates, 1886)
Agonidium explanatum (Bates, 1889)
Agonidium exultans (Basilewsky, 1988)
Agonidium fuscicorne (Guerin-Meneville, 1847)
Agonidium gracile (Peringuey, 1896)
Agonidium hyporobium (Burgeon, 1935)
Agonidium itremense (Basilewsky, 1985)
Agonidium jemjemense (Burgeon, 1937)
Agonidium johnstoni (Alluaud, 1917)
Agonidium kahuzianum (Basilewsky, 1975)
Agonidium kapiriense (Burgeon, 1935)
Agonidium kedongianum (Basilewsky, 1946)
Agonidium kenyense (Alluaud, 1917)
Agonidium kikuyu (Burgeon, 1935)
Agonidium kinangopinum (Alluaud, 1917)
Agonidium lebisi (Jeannel, 1948)
Agonidium leleupi (Basilewsky, 1951)
Agonidium longeantennatum (Burgeon, 1942)
Agonidium madecassum (Csiki, 1931)
Agonidium milloti (Jeannel, 1948)
Agonidium mus (Basilewsky, 1953)
Agonidium natalense (Boheman, 1848)
Agonidium nepalense (Habu, 1973)
Agonidium nidicola (Jeannel, 1951)
Agonidium nyakagerae (Basilewsky, 1988)
Agonidium nyikense (Basilewsky, 1988)
Agonidium obscurum (Chaudoir, 1878)
Agonidium oldeanicum (Basilewsky, 1962)
Agonidium parvicolle (Basilewsky, 1958)
Agonidium rhytoctonum (Basilewsky, 1976)
Agonidium rufipes (Dejean, 1831)
Agonidium rufoaeneum (Reiche, 1847)
Agonidium rugosicolle (Gemminger & Harold, 1868)
Agonidium strenuum (Chaudoir, 1876)
Agonidium swahilius (Bates, 1886)
Agonidium viphyense (Basilewsky, 1988)
Agonidium wittei (Basilewsky, 1953)

References

 
Platyninae